Laurel Run may refer to the following places in the United States

Communities
Laurel Run Park, in Church Hill, Tennessee
Laurel Run, Maryland, in St. Mary's County
Laurel Run, Pennsylvania, in Luzerne County
Laurel Run, West Virginia, in Preston County

Streams
Laurel Run (Bald Eagle Creek) (4 streams by this name are tributaries of Bald Eagle Creek)
Laurel Run (Bennett Branch Sinnemahoning Creek)
Laurel Run (Clearfield Creek) (2 streams by this name are tributaries of Clearfield Creek)
Laurel Run (Conemaugh River)
Laurel Run (Conewago Creek)
Laurel Run (East Branch Millstone Creek)
Laurel Run (Elk Creek)
Laurel Run (Georges Creek)
Laurel Run (Huntington Creek)
Laurel Run (Jacobs Creek tributary), a stream in Westmoreland County, Pennsylvania
Laurel Run (Lackawanna River)
Laurel Run (Little Brush Creek)
Laurel Run (Little Conemaugh River)
Laurel Run (Little Muncy Creek)
Laurel Run (Marsh Creek)
Laurel Run (Middle Branch Brodhead Creek)
Laurel Run (Mill Creek)
Laurel Run (Moshannon Creek) (2 streams by this name are tributaries of Moshannon Creek)
Laurel Run (Mud Run)
Laurel Run (Muddy Run)
Laurel Run (Muncy Run)
Laurel Run (Penns Creek)
Laurel Run (Phoenix Run)
Laurel Run (Powdermill Run)
Laurel Run (Roaring Run)
Laurel Run (Schuylkill River)
Laurel Run (Sherman Creek)
Laurel Run (South Fork Little Conemaugh River)
Laurel Run (Susquehanna River)
Laurel Run (Toby Creek)
Laurel Run (West Branch Fishing Creek)
Laurel Run (West Branch Susquehanna River) (2 streams by this name are tributaries of the West Branch Susquehanna River)

See also